DPF may refer to:

 Defence Police Federation, a British Police union
 Dense plasma focus, machine producing extremely hot, dense plasma
 , the Brazilian federal police
 Derna Protection Force, a Libyan rebel group
 Diesel particulate filter, that removes particulates from exhaust